Paranoia 2 is a thirteenth mixtape by American rapper Dave East. It was released on January 16, 2018, by Def Jam Recordings, Mass Appeal Records and From the Dirt. The Mixtape features guest appearances from Tory Lanez, T.I., Lloyd Banks, Bino Rideaux, Matt Patterson and Marsha Ambrosius. This Mixtape is a sequel to Paranoia: A True Story and serves as the second prelude towards Dave East's debut studio album.

Background
On September 27, 2017, Dave East announced the sequel to Paranoia: A True Story, just a month after its release. The EP was originally set to be released before Halloween, however the date was pushed back.

On January 2, 2018, East revealed the EP's artwork and release date via Twitter and Instagram. On January 15, 2018, the EP's tracklist was revealed.

Promotion

Tour

On January 1, 2018, Dave East announced an official headlining concert tour to further promote the album titled Paranoia 2 Tour. The tour began on January 16, 2018, in New York City, at the Irving Plaza.

Track listing
Credits adapted from Tidal.

Notes
  signifies a co-producer
  signifies an additional producer
  signifies an uncredited co-producer
 "Talk to Big" features additional vocals from Crystal Caines
 "Corey" features additional vocals from Jonnell Payton
 "Regular Harlem Shit" features vocals from Jerette Hampton and Marcus DeWitt, Jr.
 "Violent" features additional vocals from Justeen Dominguez

Personnel
Credits adapted from Tidal.

Performers
 Dave East – primary artist
 Tory Lanez – featured artist 
 Pimp Pimp P – featured artist 
 T.I. – featured artist 
 Lloyd Banks – featured artist 
 Bino Rideaux – featured artist 
 Matt Patterson – featured artist 
 Marsha Ambrosius – featured artist 

Technical
 Victor Wainstein – recording engineer 
 Fabian Marasciullo – mixer 
 McCoy Socalgargoyle – assistant mixer 
 Jeff "Ramzy" Ramirez – recording engineer 
 Mike Kuz – recording engineer , mixer 
 Johann Chavez – recording engineer 
 William Sullivan – recording engineer 
 Lorenzo Rosado – recording engineer 
 Jeremy "Tha Jerm" Gonzalez – recording engineer 
 Fabian Rubio – recording engineer 
 Isaiah Brown – recording engineer 
 William "Bilz" Dougan – assistant recording engineer 

Production
 V Don – producer 
 MP Williams – additional producer 
 Joe Joe Beats – producer , co-producer 
 Reazy Renegade – producer 
 Humbeats – producer 
 Cardiak – producer 
 DJ Khalil – co-producer 
 Illmind – producer 
 CritaCal – uncredited co-producer 
 Triple A – producer 
 Buda & Grandz – producer 
 Citoonthebeat – producer 
 DaSanchize – uncredited co-producer 
 Rico Suave – producer 
 Dinero Gotti – producer 
 Beat Butcha – additional producer 
 Street Symphony – producer 
 Kangaroo – producer

Charts

References

2018 EPs
Dave East albums
Def Jam Recordings EPs
Mass Appeal Records albums
Albums produced by DJ Khalil
Albums produced by Illmind
Albums produced by Street Symphony
Albums produced by Beat Butcha
Sequel albums